Goo Seung-Hyun (born September 22, 2004), is a South Korean actor. He began his career as a child model when he was five years old, then began acting in 2010.

Filmography

Television series

Films

Variety shows

Music video

References

External links
 
 
 

2004 births
Living people
South Korean male film actors
South Korean male television actors
South Korean male child actors